Lanko International Conference & Exhibition Tower D is a  skyscraper located in the Nan'an District of Chongqing, China.

The skyscraper was started in 2006, completed in 2010, and has 54 floors. It is a tall building complex. Other towers are 163m (45 floors) and 142m tall.

References

2010 establishments in China
Buildings and structures completed in 2010
Skyscrapers in Chongqing
Convention and exhibition centers in China